This article contains a list of notable people (officers and sailors) of the United States Navy.

Officers

Astronauts

Others

Groups
 Golden Thirteen – the thirteen African-American enlisted men who became the first African-American commissioned officers in the United States Navy.
 The Port Chicago 50 – group of 50 African-American Sailors who refused to return to work until changes were made at the U.S. Navy's Port Chicago near San Francisco.

References

 
People list